Langkat Regency is the northernmost regency of North Sumatra.  Its seat is Stabat.  Its area is 6,263.29 km2 and its population was 967,535 at the 2010 Census and 1,030,202 at the 2020 Census. The official estimate as at mid 2021 was 1,034,519.

Immediately to the south is Karo Regency, to the east is Deli Serdang Regency (which surrounds the city of Medan) and the city of Binjai (formerly part of Langkat Regency), to the north lies the Strait of Malacca and to the west lies Aceh Province.

Administrative districts
Langkat Regency is divided into twenty-three administrative districts (Indonesian: kecamatan), tabulated below with their areas and their populations at the 2010 Census and the 2020 Census, together was the official estimate as at mid 2021. The table also includes the locations of the district administrative centres, the number of administrative villages (rural desa and urban kelurahan) in each district and its post code.

Notes: (a) adjacent to, but not part of, Binjai city. (b) includes the offshore island of Pulau Selingkar. (c) includes the offshore islands of Pulau Kampai, Pulau Panjang, Pulau Rawa and Pulau Sembilan.

References 

 
Regencies of North Sumatra